The 2022 Ostrava Open (also known as the AGEL Open for sponsorship purposes) was a WTA tournament organised for female professional tennis players on indoor hard courts. The event took place at the Ostrava Arena in Ostrava, Czech Republic, from 3 through 9 October 2022.

The event was held on a third consecutive year in the alternative sporting calendar due to the cancellation of tournaments in China during the 2022 season because of the ongoing COVID-19 pandemic, as well as the suspension of tournaments in China following former WTA player Peng Shuai's allegation of sexual assault against a Chinese government official, and the tournaments in Russia due to the ongoing war with Ukraine.

Champions

Singles

  Barbora Krejčíková def.  Iga Świątek 5–7, 7–6(7–4), 6–3

This is Krejčíková's second title of the year and fifth of her career.

Doubles

  Caty McNally /  Alycia Parks def.  Alicja Rosolska /  Erin Routliffe, 6–3, 6–2

Singles main draw entrants

Seeds

 Rankings are as of September 26, 2022.

Other entrants
The following players received wildcards into the singles main draw:
  Petra Kvitová
  Tereza Martincová
  Karolína Muchová

The following players received entry from the qualifying draw:
  Anna Blinkova
  Eugenie Bouchard
  Caty McNally
  Alycia Parks
  Bernarda Pera
  Ajla Tomljanović

Withdrawals 
 During the tournament
  Belinda Bencic (left foot injury)

Retirements 
  Anett Kontaveit (lower back injury)
  Ajla Tomljanović (left knee injury)

Doubles main draw entrants

Seeds 

 1 Rankings as of September 26, 2022.

Other entrants 
The following pair received a wildcard into the doubles main draw:
  Nikola Bartůňková /  Barbora Palicová

Withdrawals 
 Before the tournament
  Chan Hao-ching /  Zhang Shuai → replaced by  Georgina García Pérez /  Ingrid Neel 
  Kirsten Flipkens /  Sara Sorribes Tormo → replaced by  Angelina Gabueva /  Anastasia Zakharova
  Vivian Heisen /  Monica Niculescu → replaced by  Anna-Lena Friedsam /  Vivian Heisen
  Nicole Melichar-Martinez /  Laura Siegemund → replaced by  Lucie Hradecká /  Linda Nosková

References

External links

Ostrava Open
Ostrava Open
Ostrava Open
Ostrava Open